Zygi is a given name. Notable people with the name include:

Zygi Kamasa (born 1969), Swedish-British entertainment studio executive and film executive producer
Zygi Wilf (born 1950), German-born American real estate developer

See also
Ziggy